Benton County Courthouse is a Second Empire style building in Benton County, Indiana that was built in 1874.

It was nominated for listing on the National Register of Historic Places in 2008, and it was listed on the National Register on August 1 of that year.

There was a previous Benton County Courthouse that was built in 1855 but was torn down in 1873.

History
Benton county was formed in 1840.  After a long struggle, the seat was moved to Fowler in 1874.

The current Benton County Courthouse, located in Fowler, was designed by Gurdon P. Randall of Chicago and built in 1874 by Levi L. Leach at a cost of $62,257.  The new courthouse was an impressive building from an architectural standpoint, but also provided much-needed improvements in security, including large fire-proof vaults.  Randall had designed the Marshall County courthouse a few years earlier.

References

External links

Benton County courthouse, at website of the Indiana judiciary
Photographs of the Benton County Courthouse from the Ball State University Digital Media Repository

County courthouses in Indiana
Courthouses on the National Register of Historic Places in Indiana
Second Empire architecture in Indiana
Government buildings completed in 1874
Buildings and structures in Benton County, Indiana
National Register of Historic Places in Benton County, Indiana
1874 establishments in Indiana